Pine Ridge is an unincorporated community in Fayette Township, Vigo County, in the U.S. state of Indiana. It is part of the Terre Haute metropolitan area.

The Pine Ridge Mine Pond reservoir is located in Pine Ridge.

Geography

References

Unincorporated communities in Indiana
Unincorporated communities in Vigo County, Indiana
Terre Haute metropolitan area